Estarm (also Romanized as Estārm and Estaram; also known as Estārd and Istārd) is a village in Nargesan Rural District, Jebalbarez-e Jonubi District, Anbarabad County, Kerman Province, Iran. At the 2006 census, its population was 267, in 56 families.

References 

Populated places in Anbarabad County